A chalet (pronounced   in British English; in American English usually  ), also called Swiss chalet, is a type of building or house, typical of the Alpine region in Europe. It is made of wood, with a heavy, gently sloping roof and wide, well-supported eaves set at right angles to the front of the house.

Definition and origin
The term chalet comes from the Arpitan-speaking part of Switzerland and the French Savoy region, and originally referred to the hut of a herder. It was often embedded in the ground for the sake of temperature buffering.

Many chalets in the European Alps were originally used as seasonal farms for dairy cattle, which would be brought up from the lowland pastures during the summer months. The herders would live in the chalet and make butter and cheese in order to preserve the milk produced. These products would then be taken, with the cattle, back to the low valleys before the onset of the alpine winter.  The chalets would remain locked and unused during the winter months. Around many chalets there are small windowless huts called mazots which were used to lock away valuable items for this period.

Modern international usage 

With the emergence of the Alpine travel business, chalets were transformed into holiday homes used by ski and hiking enthusiasts. Over the years, the term 'chalet' changed to be applied generally to holiday homes, whether built in a strictly Alpine style or not. In Quebec French, any summer or holiday dwelling, especially near a ski hill, is called a chalet whether or not it is built in the style of a Swiss chalet; English-speaking Quebecers have adopted the term as well.

Nowadays, in North America and elsewhere in the world, the use of the word chalet can refer to more than just a mountain location. The term chalet is even used to describe resort-like homes or residential properties located by the beach. For example, in Lebanon a chalet usually refers to holiday homes at one of the six Lebanese ski resorts, but the term can also refer to a beach cabin at seaside resorts. In North American ski areas, the word chalet is also used to describe buildings that house cafeterias and other services provided to the tourist, even though they may not resemble a traditional Alpine chalet. In the United States, Alpine ski chalets are gaining popularity in Colorado and the Rocky Mountain region during winter months. Most ski chalets are privately owned vacation homes that owners visit two to three times per year and rent out the remaining time. Owners of these ski chalets often hire property management companies to manage and rent their property.

In the Levant, Egypt, and Kuwait and in the Italian region of Marche, chalets refer to beach houses, rather than mountainside homes, and built in any style of architecture.

In Britain, the word chalet was used for basic sleeping accommodation at holiday camps built around the mid-20th century.

See also 

 Swiss chalet style
 American Craftsman
 Cottage
 Mar del Plata style
 Vernacular architecture

References

Bibliography
Dana, William Sumner Barton (1913), The Swiss Chalet Book; A Minute Analysis and Reproduction of the Chalets of Switzwerland, Obtained by a Special Visit to That Country, Its Architects, and Its Chalet Homes (reprinted 2009 by Nabu Press) 
Galindo, Michelle (2009), Chalet Architecture and Design, Braun Architecture AG 

House styles
Vernacular architecture